Bevil Gordon D'Urban Rudd (5 October 1894 – 2 February 1948) was a South African athlete, the 1920 Olympic Champion in the 400 metres.

Biography
Rudd was born in Kimberley. He was the son of Henry Percy Rudd and Mable Mina Blyth; paternal grandson of Charles Rudd, who co-founded the De Beers diamond mining company, and Frances Chiappini and maternal grandson of Captain Matthew Smith Blyth CMG, chief magistrate of the Transkei, and Elizabeth Cornelia Philpott.

During his schooling at St. Andrew's College, Grahamstown (Upper House) he excelled both as a student and as an athlete, and he was granted a scholarship for the University of Oxford. Rudd served in the First World War, and was awarded a Military Cross for bravery.

Rudd completed his studies in England, and returned to South Africa, working as a sports journalist.

He married Ursula Mary Knight, daughter of Clifford Hume Knight the Italian Consul to Cape Town, in 1926; they had at least two sons: Bevil John Blyth Rudd and Clifford Robin David Rudd, the South African Cricketer.

In 1930, he became an editor for  The Daily Telegraph, a position he held until after the Second World War. Shortly after his return to South Africa, he died there at age 53.

References 

1894 births
1948 deaths
Alumni of St. Andrew's College, Grahamstown
Athletes (track and field) at the 1920 Summer Olympics
British military personnel of World War I
Medalists at the 1920 Summer Olympics
Olympic athletes of South Africa
Olympic bronze medalists for South Africa
Olympic bronze medalists in athletics (track and field)
Olympic gold medalists for South Africa
Olympic gold medalists in athletics (track and field)
Olympic silver medalists for South Africa
Olympic silver medalists in athletics (track and field)
Recipients of the Military Cross
South African male middle-distance runners
South African male sprinters
South African people of English descent
South African sports journalists
Sportspeople from Kimberley, Northern Cape